Puerto Villamil is a small port village located on the southeastern edge of Isla Isabela in the Galapagos Islands. Of the 2,200 people who live on Isabela, the majority live in Puerto Villamil.  The harbor is frequently full with sailboats, as Villamil is a popular stop for private yachts making their way to the Marquesas Islands as it is the westernmost town in the Galapagos Islands. Puerto Villamil was founded in 1897 by Antonio Gil

Traditionally residents of Puerto Villamil have earned a living either through agriculture or fishing . Over the years the government has made policies to move the population away from fishing and into tourist-based activities.  This move has been hotly debated, and has created political incidents including one in 2000 when a group of sea cucumber fishermen kidnapped baby tortoises in order to have the government extend their fishing limits.

The modern church Iglesia Cristo Salvador in the middle of town is worth a visit because of its colourful wall paintings depicting various typical animals and landscapes of the island. The municipal market with a large relief on the wall showing birds of the island is close by.

On the southwestern edge of town a boardwalk was created by the park with assistance of US Aid.  It leads through mangrove environments passing along saltwater lagoons filled with flamingo, black-winged stilts, Hudsonian whimbrels, Bahama pintails, and common gallinules that come here to sweep the mud in search of brine shrimp.  At the end of the walkway is the Tortoise Breeding Center (Centro de  Crianza de Tortugas Terrestres) which was built in order to help preserve the many species of Isabela Tortoises. Poza de los Flamingos is a lake in the western part of the town where flamingos can be observed.

To the southeast of town are a series of small islets including one known as Las Tintoreras where a colony of white tip sharks can often be seen resting in the lava channel.

The ruins of a penal colony which was closed in 1959 can be visited in the west of the town. The prisoners were forced to build the El Muro de las Lágrimas, a wall with a height of up to 20 meters consisting of black lava stones which is well-preserved.

References

External links
 
 

Populated places in Galápagos Province
Port cities and towns in Ecuador
Galápagos Islands